The 2017 World Series of Poker was the 48th annual World Series of Poker (WSOP). It took place from May 30 – July 17 at the Rio All-Suite Hotel & Casino in Las Vegas, Nevada. There was a record 74 bracelet events including the third edition of the $565 Colossus tournament and the $10,000 No Limit Hold'em Main Event, which began on July 8.

The Main Event was streamed live on ESPN2 and Poker Central beginning on July 8 and ran throughout the tournament. For the first time since 2007, the Main Event concluded in July; for the previous nine years, once the final table was set the Main Event was stopped with the nine remaining players returning to the Rio in November to battle it out for the bracelet.

New events
Event 19: $365 The Giant No Limit Hold'em - The event will feature five starting flights spread out over five weeks, with remaining players returning for Day 2 on July 8. A player who survived one flight can choose to abandon their stack and re-enter into another flight. The money will be reached during each flight, giving a player the opportunity to cash multiple times in the event.
Event 23: $2,620 The Marathon No Limit Hold'em - Players will begin with 26,200 chips and play 100-minute levels.
Three WSOP.com Online Events - There will be three events offered exclusively on WSOP.com with buy-ins of $333, $1,000, and $3,333.

Event schedule
Source:

Player of the Year
Final standings as of November 10 (end of WSOPE):

Main Event
The $10,000 No Limit Hold'em Main Event began on July 8 with the first of three starting flights. The final table was reached on July 17. In a change from the November Nine, the finalists returned on July 20 with the winner being determined on July 22.

The Main Event drew 7,221 players, the largest field since 2010. The top 1,084 players finished in the money. Each player at the final table earned $1,000,000, with the winner earning $8,150,000.

Performance of past champions

 * Indicates the place of a player who finished in the money

Other notable high finishes
NB: This list is restricted to top 30 finishers with an existing Wikipedia entry.

Final Table

Antoine Saout and Ben Lamb both made the Main Event final table for the second time, having finished 3rd in 2009 and 2011, respectively. Michael Ruane, 4th-place finisher in 2016, was knocked out on the final table bubble in 10th place to just miss making it for the second straight year. Damian Salas would go on to win the Main Event in 2020.

*Career statistics prior to the beginning of the 2017 Main Event.

Final Table results

References

External links
Official site

World Series of Poker
World Series of Poker
World Series of Poker